Lake Cumberland is a reservoir in Clinton, Pulaski, Russell, Wayne, and Laurel, counties in Kentucky. The primary reasons for its construction were a means for flood control and the production of hydroelectric power.

The lake has become a major source of tourism and an economic engine for south-central Kentucky. As of April 18, 2015, the lake is back to full summer pool.

History
Lake Cumberland was impounded from the Cumberland River by the United States Army Corps of Engineers' construction of the Wolf Creek Dam in 1952. Wolf Creek Dam is the 25th largest dam in the United States, and cost $15 million to construct originally, with an additional $65 million needed almost immediately to fix problems which soon became apparent. It is estimated that the dam has prevented more than $500 million in flood damage since its construction.

Dam repairs
In 1967 a leak was found at the Wolf Creek Dam.  Repairs were made in the late 1970s at a cost of over $96 million.

On January 22, 2007, the United States Army Corps of Engineers began lowering the water level in Lake Cumberland, fearing a possible breach in Wolf Creek Dam. Water seepage had eroded the limestone under the dam, creating the potential for a breach and subsequent flood that would cause damages into the billions of dollars in cities downstream.

The drop in water level had a negative impact on the area's tourism industry as marinas and municipalities scrambled to adjust their facilities for the lower water level. The caverns beneath the structure complicated plans for repairs, but a $594 million project to construct a new wall inside the dam was completed by early 2013 and tourism officials were anticipating higher visitation numbers as the lake level was raised to 705 feet.

Since spring of 2014 Lake Cumberland water levels returned to normal operation and water levels.

Uses

Power generation
Wolf Creek Dam's six turbines are capable of supplying the needs of an average city (population of 375,000) via 270 megawatts of electricity. The power generating capacity is considered "dead" when the lake's water level is below 673 feet (205 m).

Recreation
In 1999, approximately 4.75 million visitors added more than $152.4 million to the local economy.  Of the 383 lakes controlled or maintained by the U.S. Army Corps of Engineers, Lake Cumberland ranks 4th in the nation for the number of visitor hours. Over 1,500 houseboats float on Lake Cumberland and numerous power boats play in its waters.

Lake Cumberland is home to two Kentucky state parks: Lake Cumberland State Resort Park on its shore and General Burnside State Park on an island in the middle of the lake, along with many other docks and marinas such as:

Docks/Marinas: 

 Grider Hill Marina (Albany, KY)
 Beaver Creek Marina (Wayne County, KY)
 Lake Cumberland State Resort Park (Jamestown, KY)
 Jamestown Resort & Marina (Jamestown, KY)
 Wolf Creek Marina (Nancy, KY)
 Alligator II/Indian Hills Resort (Russel Springs, KY)
 Lee's Ford Marina Resort (Nancy, KY)
 Burnside Marina (Somerset, KY)
 Bunside Island State Park (Somerset, KY)
 Omega Dock (Somerset, KY)
 Marina @ Rowena (Russel County, KY)
 Conley Bottom Resort (Wayne County, KY)

Several of Kentucky's record fish have been taken in the waters of Lake Cumberland, including:

 Brown trout (21 lb)
 Lake trout (5 lb 5 oz)
 Rainbow trout (14 lb 6 oz)
 Sauger (7 lb 7 oz)
 Striped bass (58 lb 4 oz)
 Sturgeon (36 lb 8 oz)
 Walleye (21 lb 8 oz)

Statistics

 The normal summer pool is around 723 feet (220 m) above mean sea level.
 The tree line is about 725 feet (221 m).
 The maximum pool is 760 feet (232 m) at the top of dam floodgates
 The top of Wolf Creek Dam is 773 feet (236 m).
 Lake is considered at "flood control" level from 723 to 760 feet (220 to 232 m).
 Normal power drawdown is between 723 and 673 feet (220 to 205 m).
 At 760 feet (232 m) elevation, the shoreline of Lake Cumberland is 1,255 miles (2,020 km).
 Average depth of lake at summer pool of 723 feet (220 m) above sea level: 90 feet (27 m)
 Deepest point in lake: original river channel adjacent to Wolf Creek Dam: 200 feet (60 m)
 Depth of river channel upstream of dam to Wolf Creek: generally 160 feet (50 m)
 Depth of river channel upstream of Wolf Creek to one mile (2 km) downstream of Burnside: 280 feet

The lowest water level recorded (since construction) was 675.10 feet (205.77 m) above mean sea level on January 27, 1981.  The highest water level recorded was 756.52 feet (230.6 m) above mean sea level at 5:00 AM, February 26, 2019.

See also

 General Burnside State Park
 Lake Cumberland State Resort Park
List of Dams and Reservoirs in the United States

References

External links

 Lake Cumberland Tourism Information
 Lake Cumberland State Parks
 Lake Cumberland Corps of Engineers
 PHPBB Forum rich with Data and photos of Lake Cumberland
 Lake Cumberland's Largest Facebook group full of info and answers to your questions

1952 establishments in Kentucky
Protected areas of Clinton County, Kentucky
Protected areas of Laurel County, Kentucky
Protected areas of Pulaski County, Kentucky
Reservoirs in Kentucky
Protected areas of Russell County, Kentucky
Protected areas of Wayne County, Kentucky
Bodies of water of Clinton County, Kentucky
Bodies of water of Laurel County, Kentucky
Bodies of water of Pulaski County, Kentucky
Bodies of water of Russell County, Kentucky
Bodies of water of Wayne County, Kentucky
Cumberland River